Trachelizini is a tribe of primitive weevils in the family of beetles known as Brentidae. There are at least 100 genera in Trachelizini.

Genera
These genera belong to the tribe Trachelizini:

 Achrionota Pascoe, 1872 i c g
 Acratus Lacordaire, 1865-12 i c g
 Agrioblepis Kleine, 1921 i c g
 Allodapinus Hedicke, 1923 i c g
 Amerismus Lacordaire, 1866 i c g
 Anactorus Damoiseau, 1967 i c g
 Anampyx Damoiseau, 1963 i c g
 Anchisteus Kolbe, 1883 i c g
 Aneorhachis Kleine, 1923 i c g
 Anocamara Kleine, 1920 i c g
 Aphelampyx Quentin, 1966 i c g
 Araiorrhinus Senna, 1893 i c g
 Atenophthalmus Kleine, 1920 i c g
 Autarcus Senna, 1892 i c g
 Bothriorhinus Fairmaire, 1881 i c g
 Bulbogaster Lacordaire, 1866 i c g
 Calyptulus Kleine, 1922 i c g
 Ceocephalus Guérin-Méneville, 1833 i c g
 Chalybdicus Kleine, 1922 i c g
 Dacetellum Hedicke, 1922 i c g
 Entomopisthius Muizon, 1959 i c g
 Eterodiurus Senna, 1911 i c g
 Eubactrus Lacordaire, 1866 i c g
 Eumecopodus Calabresi, 1920 i c g
 Euschizus Kleine, 1922 i c g
 Fonteboanius Senna, 1893 i c g
 Gynandrorhynchus Lacordaire, 1866 i c g
 Hemisamblus Kleine, 1925 i c g
 Hephebocerus Schoenherr, 1840 i c g
 Hetaeroceocephalus Kleine, 1921 i c g
 Heterothesis Kleine, 1914 i c g
 Higonius Lewis, 1883 i c g
 Homophylus Kleine, 1920 i c g
 Hormocerus Schoenherr, 1823 i c g
 Hovasius Senna, 1895 i c g
 Hypomiolispa Kleine, 1918 i c g
 Hypotrachelizus Kleine, 1933 i c g
 Ischnomerus Labram & Imhoff, 1838 i c g
 Ischyromerus Labram & Imhoff, 1838 i c g
 Isoceocephalus Kleine, 1920 i c g
 Ithystenomorphus Kleine, 1919 i c g
 Ithystenus Pascoe, 1862 i c g
 Kolbrentus Alonso-Zarazaga, Lyal, Bartolozzi & Sforzi, 1999-27 i c g
 Lasiorhynchus Lacordaire, 1865-12 i c g
 Leptocymatium Kleine, 1922 i c g
 Leptomiolispa Kleine, 1933 i c g
 Mesetia Blackburn, 1896 i c g
 Metatrachelus Kleine, 1925 i c g
 Microtrachelizus Senna, 1893 i c g
 Miolispa Pascoe, 1862 i c g
 Miolispoides Senna, 1894 i c g
 Neacratus Alonso-Zarazaga, Lyal, Bartolozzi & Sforzi, 1999 i c g
 Nemobrenthus Sharp, 1895 i c g
 Nemocephalinus Kleine, 1927 i c g
 Nemocephalus Guérin-Méneville, 1827 i c g
 Nemocoryna Sharp, 1895 i c g
 Neomygaleicus De Muizon, 1960 i c g
 Nothogaster Lacordaire, 1865-12 i c g
 Oxyscapanus Damoiseau, 1989 i c g
 Ozodecerus Chevrolat, 1839 i c g
 Palaeoceocephalus Kleine, 1920 i c g
 Parapisthius Kleine, 1935 i c g
 Paratrachelizus Kleine, 1921 i c g b
 Paryphobrenthus Kolbe, 1897 i c g
 Peraprophthalmus Kleine, 1923 i c g
 Periceocephalus Kleine, 1922 i c g
 Peritrachelizus Kleine, 1922 i c g
 Perroudia Damoiseau, 1962 i c g
 Phacecerus Schoenherr, 1840 i c g
 Phocylides Pascoe, 1872 i c g
 Piazocnemis Lacordaire, 1865-12 i c g
 Pithoderes Calabresi, 1920 i c g
 Plesiophocylides Kleine, 1925 i c g
 Prodector Pascoe, 1862 i c g
 Proephebocerus Calabresi, 1920 i c g
 Proteramocerus Kleine, 1921 i c g
 Pseudoceocephalus Kleine, 1920 i c g
 Pseudohigonius Damoiseau, 1987 i c g
 Pseudomygaleicus De Muizon, 1960 i c g
 Pseudophocylides Kleine, 1920 i c g
 Pterygostomus Lacordaire, 1865-12 i c g
 Pyresthema Kleine, 1922 i c g
 Rhinopteryx Lacordaire, 1865-12 i c g
 Schizephebocerus Kleine, 1923 i c g
 Schizotrachelus Lacordaire, 1865-12 i c g
 Schizuropterus Kleine, 1925 i c g
 Sclerotrachelus Kleine, 1921 i c g
 Sennaiella Alonso-Zarazaga, Lyal, Bartolozzi & Sforzi, 1999-27 i c g
 Stenobrentus Damoiseau, 1966-01 i c g
 Storeosomus Lacordaire, 1865-12 i c g
 Stroggylosternum Kleine, 1922 i c g
 Syggenithystenus Kleine, 1919 i c g
 Temnolaimus Chevrolat, 1839 i c g
 Teramocerus Schoenherr, 1840 i c g
 Thaumastopsis Kleine, 1921 i c g
 Thoracobrenthus Damoiseau, 1961 i c g
 Tracheloschizus Damoiseau, 1966 i c g
 Tulotus Senna, 1894 i c g
 Uroptera Berthold, 1827 i c g
 Uropteroides Kleine, 1922 i c g
 Vasseletia Sharp, 1895 i c g
 Zetophloeus Lacordaire, 1865-12 i c g

Data sources: i = ITIS, c = Catalogue of Life, g = GBIF, b = Bugguide.net

References

Further reading

 
 
 
 
 
 
 
 
 
 

Brentidae